Luis Ibarra Castillo (born February 23, 1953) is a former Panamanian boxer who won the World Boxing Association flyweight championship.  He was born in Colón, Panama.

Pro career
Nicknamed "El Naja", Ibarra turned professional in 1975 and won the WBA flyweight title in 1979 when he won a decision over Betulio González. He lost the belt in his first defense when he was knocked out by Tae-Shik Kim in the 2nd round in 1980.  He recaptured the WBA flyweight title with a decision win over Santos Benigno Laciar in 1981.  He again lost the belt in his first defense to Juan Herrera by TKO.  He retired the following year, and had a brief and unsuccessful comeback in 1989 and 1990 in Colombia.

External links
 

1953 births
Living people
Flyweight boxers
World boxing champions
World flyweight boxing champions
World Boxing Association champions
Panamanian male boxers